Hankavesi is a lake in Hankasalmi, Central Finland, Finland. 
It is middlesized and quite low.
Its form is like a labyrinth, with many islands and spits. Oksalansaari is one of its islands. The lake gets its water from Armisvesi lake.

See also
List of lakes in Finland

References
 Finnish Environment Institute: Lakes in Finland
 Etelä-Savon ympäristökeskus: Saimaa, nimet ja rajaukset 

Lakes of Hankasalmi